Wolf Among Wolves (German title: Wolf unter Wölfen) is a novel by Hans Fallada first published in 1937 by Rowohlt Verlag GmbH, Berlin. Its first unabridged translation into English by Philip Owens was published in 1938.

This novel has a large cast of characters and portrays post-World War I Germany. It begins in Berlin 1923 and describes the collapse of the German economy which led to rioting, starvation and widespread unemployment.

In 1965 it was adapted into an East German television series Wolf Among Wolves starring Armin Mueller-Stahl.

1937 German-language novels
Novels by Hans Fallada
Novels set in the 1920s
Novels set in Berlin
Fiction set in 1923
Rowohlt Verlag books
1937 German novels
German novels adapted into television shows